Barnathan is an Ashkenazi Jewish surname. It's the Germanicized form of the Aramaic surname Bar-Natan, and it comes from the words bar בר meaning 'son' or 'son of', and the biblical Hebrew name Natan or Natanel. Notable people with the surname include:

Dakota Barnathan (born 1994), American soccer player
Jacqueline Barnathan, American television producer
Julius Barnathan, (1927–1997), American broadcast engineer
Michael Barnathan, American film producer